Ramanathi (ராமாநதி) is a river flowing in the Tenkasi of the Indian state of Tamil Nadu.Gadananathi originates from Agasthyamalai Biosphere Reserve.This river enters Gadananathi River in Kizha Ambur. 
This river flows on many villages like Alwarkurichi, Ravanasamudram, Pottalpudur, Pillaukulam.The Gadananathi is fed by Thekkaru and Ramanathi Rivers.This was proposed and opened by Karunanithi.

Ramanathi Dam
Ramanathi reservoir is located at the foot of the Western ghats in Kadayam village of Kadayam Taluk in Tenkasi District. It is one of tourist place in this district. Now a lot of tourists are visiting the dam and park.

References

See also 
List of rivers of Tamil Nadu

Rivers of Tamil Nadu
Geography of Tirunelveli district
Rivers of India

ta:ராமாநதி (ஆறு)